Persoonia coriacea, commonly known as the leathery-leaf persoonia, is a species of flowering plant in the family Proteaceae and is endemic to the south-west of Western Australia.

Description
The branches and leaves are hairy at first but become glabrous with age. Some populations, such as plants near Yellowdine, have more twisted leaves than others.

Taxonomy and naming
Persoonia coriacea was first formally described in 1928 by James Wales Claredon Audas and Patrick Francis Morris from specimens collected by Max Koch near Merredin on 30 November 1923. The description was published in the Journal of the Royal Soceity of Western Australia. Within the genus Persoonia, P. coriacea is classified in the lanceolata group, a group of 54 closely related species with similar flowers but very different foliage. These species will often interbreed with each other where two members of the group occur. In the case of this species, it hybridizes with P. helix.

Distribution and habitat
Persoonia coriacea is found in the southwest of Western Australia, from Carnamah southwards to Lake Grace and Lake King and east across to Plumridge Lakes. It grows on yellow sand dunes or sandplains, or on sandy clay soils, sometimes over laterite, red sand or granite and occurs in heathland and mallee heath plant communities. The uncommon blue-breasted fairywren has been recorded using this shrub as a nest site.

Use in horticulture
Held to have little horticultural appeal, Persoonia coriacea is not known to be cultivated.

References

coriacea
Eudicots of Western Australia
Plants described in 1928